The Midlands is the central region of England.

Midlands may also refer to:

Places

Africa
 Midlands, Mauritius
 Midlands of KwaZulu-Natal, South Africa
 Midlands Province, Zimbabwe

Europe
 Midlands Region, Ireland 
 Central Belt, Scotland; formerly known as Scottish Midlands
 Vidzeme, Latvia

Elsewhere
 Midlands (Louisville, Kentucky), United States
 Midlands (Tasmania), Australia
 Midlands of South Carolina, United States

Other uses
 Midlands (women's field hockey team), in New Zealand

See also
 Swiss Plateau, Switzerland
 Midland Valley (disambiguation)
 Midland (disambiguation)